Bloody Sabor of Križevci or Bloody Parliament Session or Križevci Bloody Assembly was an organised killing of the former Croatian ban Stephen II Lackfi and his followers by King Sigismund, in Križevci, Croatia on 27 February 1397. The episode was part of a quarter century long fight over the Hungarian-Croatian crown after the death of Louis I of Hungary. In this prolonged struggle, Croatia was a stronghold of the Anjou-Durazzo party fighting against king Sigismund.

Prelude
After the disastrous Battle of Nicopolis, King Sigismund called for the Sabor in city of Križevci and issued a written guarantee (saluus conductus) stating he would not attempt personal revenge on the opponents or harm them in any way. But, he organised the killing of the Croatian Ban Stephen Lackfi (Stjepan Lacković) and his followers for supporting the opponent king candidate Ladislaus of Naples. The Croatian law dictated that no one could enter the Sabor with arms, so Ban Lackfi and his supporters left their arms in front of the church. Lackfi's supporting troops also remained outside the town. The king's supporters, on the other hand, were already in the church, fully armed. In the turbulent debate that followed, the king's supporters accused Lackfi for treason in the Battle of Nicopolis. Harsh words were used, fight started, and the king's vassals pulled their swords in front of the king, gutted Ban Lackfi, his nephew Stephen III Lackfi, who formerly served as Master of the horse, and the supporting nobility.

Aftermath

On the news of the Ban's death, the Croatian army rushed to Križevci and the battle with Sigismund supporters. In an unequal struggle thirty Croats fell, before they retreated.

Enraged Croatian nobility, led by Stjepan Prodavić, once again tried to take revenge for Lackfi's murder on the king, but they  were suppressed, and Sigismund used the opportunity with his subjects on  March 2  crossed Drava river and fled to Hungary. Two days later he issued in Žakanj the famous charter by which city Čakovec (Csáktornya), Međimurje and other estates of Stephen Lackfi were donated to his loyal subjects, among the first Hermann II, Count of Celje.

Bloody Sabor resulted in Sigismund's fear of the revenge of Lackfi's men, new rebellions of the nobles in Croatia and Bosnia, the death of 170 Bosnian nobles who were killed by Sigismund, and selling off Dalmatia to Venice for 100,000 ducats by Ladislaus of Naples. Finally, after 25 years of fighting, Sigismund succeeded in seizing power and was recognized as a king by means of giving privileges to the Croatian nobility.

References

Further reading
 

Massacres in Croatia
1397 in Europe
14th century in Croatia
Sigismund, Holy Roman Emperor